TPP Nikola Tesla, commonly known as TENT, is a power plant complex operated by Elektroprivreda Srbije, located on the right bank of the river Sava, approximately 40 km upstream from Downtown Belgrade, near the city municipality of Obrenovac. By far the largest one in Serbia, the complex generates around 17.263 GWh annually, which covers almost half of Serbia's needs for electricity. The complex and two of its plants are named in honor of Nikola Tesla.

These power plants use lignite mined from the RB Kolubara as fuel. Coal is transported from the mines via a standard-gauge railroad about 30 km long capable of supplying a total of 37 million tons of coal a year.

Power plants

TPP Nikola Tesla A
Six generation units with a combined capacity of 1650.5 MW that makes it the largest power facility in the former Yugoslavia. TPP Nikola Tesla A was first synchronised on March 27, 1970. It has two chimneys: one with a height of 220 metres and a second with a height of 150 metres.

TPP Nikola Tesla B
Located between the villages of Skela and Ušće. There are two generation units with a total capacity of 1240 MW. TPP Nikola Tesla B was first synchronised on March 11, 1983. Its chimney is 280 metres tall.

TPP Morava
Located on the right bank of the river Velika Morava near the town of Svilajnac. 125 MW Power Generator.

TPP Kolubara A
Located at the edge of Kolubara coal basin in the village Veliki Crljeni. Capacity 271 MW.

Railway transport of TPP Nikola Tesla

TPP Nikola Tesla operates its own railway with over 100 km rail tracks total. The railway is used for coal transport from the mines to the power plants. It is independent from the national rail freight transport company Srbija Kargo.

Railroad

Railway tracks are electrified with 25 kV 50 Hz overhead line. The line is powered from Brgule. The railway has connection to the Belgrade–Bar railway at Vreoci.

Main railway tracks:
Obrenovac - Vreoci, 32.45 km.
Obrenovac - Stubline, single track, 8.05 km. Built in 1967.
Stubline - Brgule, double track, 10.58 km. Right track built in 1967, another, left track built in 1982.
Brgule - Vreoci, single track, 13.85 km. Built in 1967.

Terminal railway tracks:
Stubline - Vorbis, single track, 14.42 km. Built in 1979.
Brgule - Tamnava, single track, 3.32 km. Built in 1979.

Train stations
There are several loading, unloading train stations and interstations.

Loading stations:
Vreoci - 7 rail tracks of which 4 are loading tracks with two loading places.
Tamnava - 4 rail tracks of which 2 are loading tracks with one loading place.

Unloading stations:
Obrenovac "A" - 5 rail tracks with of which 2 are unloading tracks with two unloading places.
Vorbis "B" - 5 rail tracks with of which one is unloading track with one unloading place.
 
Interstations:
Stubline - 4 rail tracks for regulation of traffic, switching from single track railway to double track railway.
Brgule - 3 rail tracks for regulation of traffic, switching from single track railway to double track railway.

Rolling stock

Locomotives
Railway transport of TPP NT has a fleet of 18 electric locomotives and 8 diesel locomotives. Nine locomotives are used for freight train hauling and 16 are used for maneuvering.

Electric locomotives
Class 441 - 8 locomotives
Class 443 (Skoda lokomotives identical to České dráhy class 210 shunters) - 10 locomotives

Diesel locomotives
Class 661 - 2 locomotives
CEM - 5 locomotives

Wagons
Railway transport of TPP NT operates with 334 Class F special open high-sided wagons made by Arbel. Wagons are equipped with hydraulic installation for fast discharge, which allows to unload coal for 1–2 seconds. Each wagon is 15.16m long, has four axles and capacity of 56.4 tons.

References

External links

 
 Serbia Energy News: http://www.serbia-energy.eu

Elektroprivreda Srbije
Energy companies established in 1991
Coal-fired power stations in Serbia
Electric power companies of Serbia
Government-owned companies of Serbia
Companies based in Obrenovac
Nikola Tesla
Serbian companies established in 1991